

Generalleutnant Walter von Hippel (Luftwaffe) (27 May 1897 – 29 November 1972) was a general in the Luftwaffe of Nazi Germany during World War II who commanded several flak divisions. He was also a recipient of the Knight's Cross of the Iron Cross.

Promotions:
 Portepee-Fähnrich: 8 August 1914
 Degen-Fähnrich: 21 December 1914 (Patent 24 December 1914)
 Leutnant (without Patent): 24 December 1914 (Patent established 27 January 1915)
 Oberleutnant: 10 August 1925 (RDA 1 April 1925)
 Rittmeister/Hauptmann: 1 April 1931
 Major: 1 January 1936
 Oberstleutnant: 1 January 1939
 Oberst: 19 July 1940
 Generalmajor: 1 April 1943
 Generalleutnant: 1 August 1944

Commands & Assignments:
 8 August 1914 – 23 December 1914: Portepee-Fähnrich in Infanterie-Regiment Großherzhog von Sachsen (5. Thüringisches) Nr.94.
 24 December 1914 – 11 March 1915: Platoon Leader, Infantry Regiment 94.
 11 March 1915 – 5 October 1915: Wounded/hospital.
 18 May 1915 – 11 September 1915: At the same, detached to War School Courses in Kassel.
 6 October 1915 – 13 August 1916: Company chief in Infantry Regiment 94.
 14 August 1916 – 21 August 1916: Deputy Adjutant of I./Infantry Regiment 94.
 22 August 1916 – 4 November 1916: Sick/in hospital.
 5 November 1916 – 1 September 1918: Adjutant of I./Infantry Regiment 94.
 1 September 1917 – 20 October 1917: At the same time, detached as Deputy Adjutant of Infantry Regiment 94. 2 September 1918 – 8 October 1918: Commander of I./Infantry Regiment 94.
 8 October 1918 – 17 July 1919: Wounded and in British captivity.
 17 July 1919 – 24 August 1919: At the disposal of. 25 August 1919 – 4 September 1919: Ordnance Officer on the staff of Brigade von Taysen / Guard Cavalry Schützen Division.
 5 September 1919 – 14 May 1920: Ordnance Officer on the staff of Schützen Regiment 59, unit later renamed Infantry Regiment 6.
 15 May 1920 – 18 May 1920: Ordnance Officer on the staff of Infantry Regiment 5.
 19 May 1920 – 31 August 1920: Ordnance Officer on the staff of II (Guard Jäger Battalion)/Infantry Regiment 5.
 1 September 1920 – 31 December 1920: Platoon leader in Infantry Regiment 5.
 3 September 1920 – 20 October 1920: At the same time, detached as Deputy Ordnance Officer to the Operations Officer (Ia) of Reichswehr Brigade 3.
 1 January 1921 – 23 October 1921: Platoon leader in Infantry Regiment 9.
 24 October 1921 – 22 October 1922: Detached as Commandant of Staff Quarters on the staff of the 3rd Division.
 23 October 1922 – 25 August 1924: Platoon leader in Infantry Regiment 9.
 25 June 1923 – 15 July 1923: At the same time, detached as deputy company leader in Infantry Regiment 9.
 26 August 1924 – 14 October 1926: Transferred to the staff of Infantry Regiment 9.
 15 October 1926 – 30 September 1929: Platoon leader in Infantry Regiment 9.
 4 April 1927 – 12 June 1927: Detached to II Officers' Weapons School Course Dresden.
 1 April 1928 – 30 September 1928: Detached as Assistance Officer to the Operations Officer (Ia) on the staff of the 3rd Division.
 1 April 1929 – 30 September 1929: Detached to II./Schiffsstamm-Division, Baltic Sea.
 1 October 1929 – 30 September 1932: Transferred to Cavalry Regiment 11 and, at the same time, detached as Training Officer to the Commanding Officer of Oppeln.
 1 October 1932 – 31 March 1933: On the staff of the Training Battalion of Infantry Regiment 9.
 10 January 1933 – 31 March 1933: Detached to Tactical Technical Officers' Course with the Kraftfahr-Lehrstab [Motorized Instruction/Demonstration Staff], Berlin.
 1 April 1933 – 21 May 1934: Company chief in Infantry Regiment 9.
 22 May 1934 – 24 September 1934: Leader of Machinegun Experimental Command Döberitz.
 22 May 1934 – 8 June 1934: Detached to the Air Defense Course Pillau.
 19 July 1934 – 28 July 1934: Detached to Antiaircraft Machinegun Course in Schillig-Reede.
 24 August 1934 – 19 September 1934: Detached to Antiaircraft Machinegun Course at the Flak School Döberitz and Wustrow.
 25 September 1934 – 31 March 1935: Company chief in Transport Battalion Brandenburg.
 1 April 1935: Transferred from the Army to the Luftwaffe.
 1 April 1935 – 30 September 1935: Battery chief in Flak Battalion Brandenburg.
 1 October 1935 – 31 December 1935: Staff of Higher Flak Artillery Commander II.
 1 January 1936 – 31 March 1936: Chief Personnel Officer (IIa) on the staff of Higher Flak Artillery Commander II.
 1 April 1936 – 31 March 1938: Operations officer (Ia) to the Senior Commander of Flak Artillery in Luftkreis [Air District] II.
 1 April 1938 – 14 October 1938: Chief of Staff, Luftgau [Air Zone] Command IV, Dresden.
 15 October 1938 – 14 November 1938: Commander of IV./Luftwaffe Regiment "General Göring."
 15 November 1938 – 26 January 1939: Commander of II./Luftwaffe Regiment "General Göring."
 27 January 1939 – 30 September 1939: Commander of IV./Luftwaffe Regiment "General Göring."
 1 October 1939 – 5 July 1940: Commander of Flak-Regiment 102 (motorized).
 6 July 1940 – 7 September 1940: Commander of Flak-Regiment 43 in Dessau.
 8 September 1940 – 3 February 1941: Tactics Instructor at the Air War Academy, Berlin-Gatow.
 4 February 1941 – 31 March 1941: Commander of Flak-Brigade 1.
 1 April 1941 – 30 June 1942: Commander of Flak-Brigade X.
 1 July 1942 – 19 April 1944: Commander of 3. Flak-Division, Hamburg.
 20 April 1944 – 31 January 1945: Commander of 25. Flak-Division.
 1 February 1945 – 8 May 1945: Flak Leader of the 10th Army in Italy.
 1 May 1944 – 8 May 1945: At the same time, Higher Flak Leader Italy.
 8 May 1945 – 1948: British prisoner of war.
 9 January 1946 transferred to Island Farm Special Camp 11 from Camp 1
 12 May 1948 transferred to Camp 186 for repatriation

Awards and decorations
 Knight's Cross of the Iron Cross on 29 July 1940 as Oberstleutnant and commander of Flak-Regiment 102 (mot.)
 Prussian Iron Cross, 1st Class (1914): 27 May 1917.
 Prussian Iron Cross, 2nd Class (1914): 16 March 1915.
 1939 Bar to the Prussian Iron Cross, 1st Class: 1 June 1940.
 1939 Bar to the Prussian Iron Cross, 2nd Class: 15 May 1940.
 Saxe-Weimar-Eisenach Wilhelm Ernst War Cross (one of only 362 ever awarded): 8 August 1917.
 Saxe-Weimar-Eisenach House Order of Vigilance or the White Falcon, Knight 2nd Class with Swords: 22 March 1915.
 Saxe-Ernestine Ducal House Order, Knight 2nd Class with Swords: 18 July 1918.
 Hesse General Honor Decoration, “for Bravery”: 1 October 1918.
 Cross of Honor for Combatants 1914–1918
 Armed Forces Long Service Award, 1st Class (25-year Service Cross)
 Armed Forces Long Service Award, 3rd Class (12-year Service Medal)
 Luftwaffe Flak Combat Badge: 25 August 1941.
 Luftwaffe Ground Combat Badge: 13 October 1942.
 Wound Badge in Silver – World War I award: September 1918.

References

Citations

Bibliography

 

1897 births
1972 deaths
People from Opole County
People from the Province of Silesia
Luftwaffe World War II generals
German prisoners of war in World War I
World War I prisoners of war held by the United Kingdom
Prussian Army personnel
Recipients of the clasp to the Iron Cross, 1st class
Recipients of the Knight's Cross of the Iron Cross
German prisoners of war in World War II held by the United Kingdom
Lieutenant generals of the Luftwaffe
German Army personnel of World War I